Guanacaste is a province of Costa Rica located in the northwestern region of the country, along the coast of the Pacific Ocean. It is bordered by Nicaragua to the north, Alajuela Province to the east, and Puntarenas Province to the southeast. It is the most sparsely populated of all the provinces of Costa Rica.

Guanacaste's capital is Liberia. Other important cities include Cañas and Nicoya.

Etymology

The province is named for the guanacaste tree, also known as the ear pod tree, which is the national tree of Costa Rica.

History

Before the Spanish arrived, this territory was inhabited by Chorotega Indians from the towns of Zapati, Nacaome, Paro, Cangel, Nicopasaya, Pocosí, Diriá, Papagayo, Namiapí and Orosí. The Corobicies lived on the eastern shore of the Gulf of Nicoya and the Nahuas or Aztecan in the zone of Bagaces.

The first church was built out of grass in Nicoya in the 17th century.

In the 18th century some neighbors from Rivas, Nicaragua, established their houses and cattle farms in the northern part of the Nicoya Peninsula at crossroads that connected the towns of Bagaces, Nicoya and Rivas. The place was baptized after the guanacaste trees that grow in the neighborhood.

After a plebiscite in 1824-25, the territory of Guanacaste was annexed to Costa Rica. In 1836 the town of Guanacaste was declared the capital of the Guanacaste province. In 1854 the town of Guanacaste was renamed Liberia.

In 2013, Nicaraguan president Daniel Ortega claimed Guanacaste province belonged to Nicaragua. Taking over Guanacaste would greatly increase the continental shelf area available to Nicaragua for oil exploration concessions, and move the Nicaraguan border to within  of Costa Rican capital San José.

Geography

The province is bounded on the east by a group of green-swathed volcanoes forming the Cordillera de Guanacaste (which features Orosi, Rincón de la Vieja, Miravalles and Tenorio volcanoes) and the Cordillera de Tilarán. The rivers that tumble out of these steep mountains flow down to rolling flatlands, forming a vast alluvial plain drained by the Rio Tempisque, which empties through swampy wetlands into de Golfo de Nicoya. The Rio Tempisque defines one side of the horsehead-shaped Península de Nicoya enclosing the gulf to the west.

Climate
Guanacaste's climate and culture are unique among Costa Rican provinces. The province experiences little rain and consistent heat from November to April, resulting in ubiquitous tropical dry forests as a natural adaption to the dry season conditions. Tourists seek out this dry heat during the North American winter to enjoy the Guanacastecan beaches. Irrigation of the agricultural land is necessary during the long dry period. From May to October, the climate is similar to that of San José, consisting of showers daily and moderate temperatures. Guanacaste is, however, considerably warmer than other provinces in the country located in higher elevations.

Tourism
Main attractions of tourists include water, land, mountains, volcanoes, and coastal ecosystems. The two main commercial areas Santa Cruz and Liberia with six surrounding tourism development centers: Papagayo Peninsula, El Coco, Las Catalinas, Flamingo, Conchal, and Tamarindo. Liberia is central to the six locations and is complete with an airport. Animal rehab center, Centro de Rescate Las Pumas, is located in the heart of Area de Conservación Guanacaste World Heritage Site. The Guanacaste province is home to the bulk of Costa Rica's all-inclusive resorts.

Demographics
Most of the population descends from Chorotega Natives and Spaniards, with some Africans as a result of a large number of slaves working the land during the colonial period. As in Nicaragua and elsewhere in Costa Rica, Usted is the form of address used by Guanacastecans upon initial meetings and typically among adults. The vos verb-form is used mainly when adults address children, especially their own, and occasionally between adults who are family members or good friends.

The Chorotega culture and the Spanish culture have successfully integrated; among the main cultural elements are their music, literature (folklore), musical instruments, bullfighting, and religious events.

Economy

The province has an economic and cultural heritage based on beef cattle ranching. Most of the area is covered by small patches of forest, scattered trees and large pastures of coarse grasses where Brahman cattle and related breeds graze.
Historically, the main source of income of Guanacaste was cattle ranching. Cattle ranching is declining in Guanacaste due to an international drop in the demand for beef. Many pastures are naturally reverting to dry forest or are being converted to tree plantations.

The other agricultural products of relative importance in the province are sugar cane and cotton, and since the late 1980s, with the creation of a large-scale irrigation program (the water comes from Lake Arenal after passing through several power generating stations), rice has become a prominent crop.

Since the late 20th century, tourism has emerged as the new and growing activity in the local economy. The combination of beaches like Playas del Coco, Playa Tamarindo, and the sunny dry season that coincides with the winter months in northern latitudes have made tourism a key economic activity. A lot of tourists are also attracted by the Province's seven national parks. These include the Santa Rosa, Guanacaste and Rincon de la Vieja National Parks.

Political divisions

Guanacaste is subdivided into eleven cantons.  The cantons (with their capitals in parentheses) are:

 Liberia (Liberia)
 Nicoya (Nicoya)
 Santa Cruz (Santa Cruz)
 Bagaces (Bagaces)
 Carrillo (Filadelfia)
 Cañas (Cañas)
 Abangares (Las Juntas)
 Tilarán (Tilarán)
 Nandayure (Carmona)  
 La Cruz (La Cruz)
 Hojancha (Hojancha)

A major portion of the peninsula of Nicoya is now under the jurisdiction of the province of Puntarenas. This may change in the future, as there is constant debate over the remapping of the area.

See also
 Gulf of Nicoya
 Nicoya Peninsula
 Partido de Nicoya
 Independent Guanacaste Party
 Area de Conservación Guanacaste World Heritage Site
 Guanacaste Day

References

External links

El Área de Conservación Guanacaste 
Conservation efforts and scientific work of biologist Daniel H. Hanzen in Guanacaste
Costa Rica Guanacaste

 
Provinces of Costa Rica